Adolfo Mario Amador Fernández (23 January 1844, in Medellín –  5 February 1885, in Honda) was a Colombian military officer, politician, jurist and diplomat.

Life 
He also was the brother of the famous businessman .

At a young age, he joined the Colombian National Army, reaching the rank of General in 1877. Also served as deputy to the Antioquia State Assembly and Political Chief of Medellín.

As diplomat, he served as Consul of Colombia in Denmark, and worked at the Colombian embassies in the United States and France. In his last years, joined to the High Court of Auditors and served as Attorney General of the Cundinamarca State and as General Secretary of the Cundinamarca State Assembly.

References 

People from Medellín
Colombian Liberal Party politicians
Colombian jurists
Colombian diplomats
Colombian generals
Colombian governors
Members of the Chamber of Representatives of Colombia
Members of the Senate of Colombia
Colombian military personnel killed in action

1844 births
1885 deaths